"Splackavellie" is an R&B song by American singer Pressha, released as the first single from his debut album Don't Get It Twisted and from the soundtrack to the 1998 film The Players Club, peaking at #27 on the Billboard Hot 100 and #14 on the Billboard R&B/Hip-Hop Singles chart.

Charts

Weekly charts

Year-end charts

References

1998 singles
Pressha songs